HMS Dorsetshire, the first Royal Navy ship to be named after the county of Dorset, was an 80-gun third rate ship of the line of the Royal Navy, launched at Southampton on 8 December 1694.

Dorsetshire came under the command of Edward Whitaker in 1704 and she was at the capture of Gibraltar (but out of commission). Whitaker then took the ship to play a part in the Battle of Málaga the same year.

She was rebuilt according to the 1706 Establishment at Portsmouth Dockyard, and relaunched on 20 September 1712. As built, Dorsetshire had carried her 80-gun armament on two decks, but during this rebuild they were redistributed over a third gundeck, although she continued to be classified as a third rate.

Dorsetshire continued to serve until 1749, when she was sold out of the navy.

Notes

References

Lavery, Brian (2003) The Ship of the Line - Volume 1: The development of the battlefleet 1650-1850. Conway Maritime Press. .

Ships of the line of the Royal Navy
1690s ships